Maurice Junior Dalé (born 12 July 1985) is a French professional footballer of who plays as a striker for ES Fosséenne.

Career
The French-Ivorian began his career with FC Martigues, where he played until 2008 while spending 2007 on loan at US Le Pontet.

In July 2008, Dalé joined AJ Auxerre, where he played his first professional match in the Ligue 1 on 13 December 2008 against Paris Saint-Germain.

On 7 August 2009, AC Arles-Avignon signed the forward from AJ Auxerre.

After one season with Arles-Avignon, Dalé signed for Unirea Urziceni. Due to financial problems of Unirea Urziceni, Dalé on 25 August 2010 agreed to go on loan to Panserraikos F.C. for one year. On 3 October 2010, he scored his first goal for Panserraikos in a 1–0 home win of his team against Larissa.

After two-year stint at Romania and Greece, he returned to France and joined FC Nantes on 28 June 2011. In 2014, Dalé signed with Nancy. In the 2016–17 season he made 25 Ligue 1 appearances scoring three goals while Nancy suffered relegation.

In July 2017, Dalé joined Giresunspor of the TFF First League, the Turkish second tier, on a two-year contract with the option of a third.

After returning to FC Martigues in January 2020, Dalé moved to ES Fosséenne in the summer 2020.

References

External links
playerhistory.com  
France Football Stats

1985 births
Living people
French footballers
French sportspeople of Ivorian descent
Association football forwards
FC Martigues players
AJ Auxerre players
FC Nantes players
AC Arlésien players
FC Unirea Urziceni players
Panserraikos F.C. players
US Pontet Grand Avignon 84 players
AS Nancy Lorraine players
Giresunspor footballers
Ligue 1 players
Ligue 2 players
Championnat National players
Championnat National 2 players
Championnat National 3 players
Liga I players
Super League Greece players
TFF First League players
French expatriate sportspeople in Romania
Ivorian expatriate sportspeople in Romania
Expatriate footballers in Romania
Expatriate footballers in Greece
French expatriate sportspeople in Greece
Ivorian expatriate sportspeople in Greece